Wouter Degroote (born 28 January 1978) is a Belgian footballer.

He previously played for clubs including FCV Dender EH.

References

External links
  Wouter Degroote on Footballdatabase

1978 births
Living people
Belgian footballers
S.V. Zulte Waregem players
F.C.V. Dender E.H. players
S.C. Eendracht Aalst players
Footballers from Ghent
Association football midfielders